Fantastic Aussie Tours is an Australian bus company in the Blue Mountains.

History
In 1974, John Cronshaw purchased Katoomba Scenic Tours and rebranded it Golden West Tours. In the 1980s, an alliance was formed with Bus Australia with the business renamed Fantastic Aussie Tours and the Bus Australia livery adopted.

On 11 February 1990, Fantastic Aussie Tours commenced operating a service between Sydney and Armidale commenced under contract to CountryLink as a replacement for the Northern Tablelands Express with Denning coaches in a joint venture with Manly Bus Service.
In 1992, Fantastic Aussie Tours commenced operating a double-deck service. In July 2010, it began operating a City Sightseeing franchise. It was initially operated by Leyland Atlanteans and is currently operated by former Lothian Buses Alexander Volvo Olympians.

Fleet
As of August 2022, the fleet consists of 10 buses and coaches.

References

External links
Company website

Bus companies of New South Wales
City Sightseeing
Transport companies established in 1974
1974 establishments in Australia
Transport in the Blue Mountains (New South Wales)